Dutch Mills is one of thirty-seven townships in Washington County, Arkansas, USA. As of the 2000 census, its total population was 321.

Dutch Mills Township was established in 1885.

Geography
Dutch Mills Township was created in 1885.

Cities, towns, villages
Dutch Mills
Sexton (historical)

Cemeteries
The township contains White Rock Cemetery.

Major routes
 Arkansas Highway 59

References

 United States Census Bureau 2008 TIGER/Line Shapefiles
 United States National Atlas

External links
 US-Counties.com
 City-Data.com

Townships in Washington County, Arkansas
Populated places established in 1885
Townships in Arkansas